Cynaeus is a genus of beetles belonging to the family Tenebrionidae.

The species of this genus are found in Europe and Northern America.

Species:
 Cynaeus angustus (LeConte, 1851)'

References

Tenebrionidae